Flank may refer to:
 Flank (anatomy), part of the abdomen
 Flank steak, a cut of beef
 Part of the external anatomy of a horse
 Flank speed, a nautical term
 Flank opening, a chess opening
 A term in Australian rules football
 The side of a military unit, as in a flanking maneuver
 Flanking, a sound path in architectural acoustics
 Flanking region, a region of DNA in directionality
 Rift flank (synonymous of rift shoulder), mountains belt on the sides of extensional rift basins

See also
 Flanker (disambiguation)